The Slovakia men's national water polo team is the representative for Slovakia in international men's water polo. The governing body is from 2017 Slovak Swimming Federation (Slovak: Slovenská plavecká federácia). It was established in 1993 as the successor state of the Czechoslovakia, so all its results fully belong to it.

History

History before 1993

During Second World War in the years 1939 to 1945, when there was First Slovak Republic, the then national team played several friendly international matches. They completed their first match in 1942 in Zagreb, where they lost 2 : 3 to the Croatian men's national water polo team.

After Independence in 1993

Olympic Games  
At the Olympic Games, the Slovak team qualified only once, in Sydney for the Summer Olympics 2000. They completed 4 qualifications, but only that qualification from Hannover in 2000 was able to fight her way to the Olympics. In the games themselves, they lost all matches and finished in last place.

World Championship  
The team qualified 3 times for the World Championships. They first qualified for the 1998 World Championships in Perth, Australia, where they advanced from the preliminary to the second round and later to the 9th to 12th place fights. After 4 victories in the tournament, they took 10th place overall.

Three years later, in Fukuoka, Japan, it finished worse when it was able to score in only two matches: in the basic group with Brazil and in the match for 11th place with Kazakhstan.

At the World Championships 2003, organized by the Spanish Barcelona and where the competition system changed, the team advanced to the round of 16. Surprisingly, they went through Germany and made it his biggest success. In subsequent placement matches, it was no longer enough for USA and then for Australia to finish 8th overall.

In 2005, a European qualification took place in Italy for the World Championships 2005, where the team advanced to the semifinals. The first 3 teams advanced to the World Cup, but after losing to Croatia and then also in the battle for 3rd place with Romania they took 4th place, first non-promotive.

European Championship
At the European Championships, the team advanced from qualification right after its establishment in 1993 to its first European Water Polo Championship, where it was won by coach Karol Schmuck 10th place. From the B tournament of the European Championships in 1994, the team did not make it to the 1995 Men's European Water Polo Championship.

2 years later, yes, and at the 1997 European Championships, after 3 wins in the basic group, they took the overall 8th place in the tournament. From 1996 to 2001, Ladislav Bottlik led the men's national team. In 1999, in Florence, Italy, under his leadership, the team did not advance from the basic group to the quarterfinals and lost to Romania by 9th place in overtime. At the 2001 European Championships in Budapest, they made it to the quarterfinals, in which she narrowly lost to Yugoslavia - the later winner of the 7: 8 championship, and finally took 8th place. In 2001, coach Ondrej Gajdáč joined the team.

In 2003, Slovakia organized one of the qualification groups on its territory, from which the team qualified for the 2003 European Championships in Kranj, Slovenia. After advancing from the basic group, after defeat in the quarterfinals with Croatia and in the match for the 5th Spain. In the match for the final 7th place, however, they defeated Greece and won its best position at the European Championships.

In 2005, Ladislav Vidumanský took over the national team, and in 2006 he managed to advance to the European Championship again. At the 2006 European Championships in Belgrade, Serbia, after a draw in the basic group with the Netherlands and the victory for the final position over Slovenia, the Slovak team took the penultimate 11th place. For the first time since 2007, the head coach was a foreign coach - 65-year-old Croatian Ante Nakič, nicknamed Mile. The Slovak team fought its way to the 2008 European Championships, which took place in Malaga, Spain, but after seven losses it took the last place.

In 2009, Roman Poláčik took over the coaching bench, who also led the national team in qualifying for the 2010 European Championships, which took place in the Turkish Istanbul, and the Slovak team failed to make it to the continental championship for the first time. After a surprising loss in the first match with the home Turkey came a close second loss to Spain and even a high victory in the third match with Malta did not help to advance from the group.

Two years later in the European Championship 2012 qualification, the team advanced from 2nd place in the group to the draw, but after two clear losses with Greece did not advance to the European Championship again. The national team was already led by a former three-time assistant national team coach Pavol Sirotný. The team, which was then led by the Spanish coach Antonio Esteller Serrahima, did not make it to its eighth European Championship until 2016. In the tournament, they lost all 3 matches in the basic group, as well as the first 2 matches in the elimination round. After the subsequent victories over Malta and Georgia, they finished 13th, guaranteeing them the last possible promotion to the World Olympic Qualifying Tournament. They did not advance to the Rio 2016 Summer Olympics in this tournament and ended up in a non-promotion 11th place. In these tournaments, the team was led by Spanish coach Antonio Esteller Serrahima.

Recently, the team qualified for the 2018 Men's European Water Polo Championship and 2020 European Championships, finishing both in 14th place. The national team coach is a former slovak water polo player Peter Nižný.

Results

Olympic Games
2000 – 12th place

World Championship
1998 – 10th place
2001 – 11th place
2003 – 8th place

European Championship
1993 – 10th place
1997 – 8th place
1999 – 10th place
2001 – 8th place
2003 – 7th place
2006 – 11th place
2008 – 12th place
2016 – 13th place
2018 – 14th place
2020 – 14th place
2022 – 15th place

European Games
2015: 12th

Team

Current squad
Roster for the 2020 Men's European Water Polo Championship.

Head coach: Peter Nižný

Notable players
 Karol Bačo
 Martin Faměra
 Alexander Nagy
 Lukáš Seman
 Juraj Zaťovič

References

Men's national water polo teams
 
Men's sport in Slovakia